New Zealand at the 1966 British Empire and Commonwealth Games was represented by a team of 60 competitors and 18 officials. Selection of the team for the Games in Kingston, Jamaica, was the responsibility of the New Zealand Olympic and British Empire Games Association. New Zealand's flagbearer at the opening ceremony was weightlifter Don Oliver.  The New Zealand team finished fourth on the medal table, winning a total of 26 medals, eight of which were gold.

New Zealand has competed in every games, starting with the British Empire Games in 1930 at Hamilton, Ontario.

Medal tables
New Zealand was fourth in the medal table in 1966, with a total of 26 medals, including eight gold.

Competitors
The following table lists the number of New Zealand competitors participating at the Games according to gender and sport.

Athletics

Track and road

Field

Combined

Badminton

Boxing

Cycling

Road
Men's road race

Track

Men's 1000 m sprint

Men's 1 km time trial

Men's 4000 m individual pursuit

Men's 10 miles scratch race

Diving

Fencing

Men

Individual

Team

Women

Individual

Team

Shooting

Open small bore rifle

Open full bore rifle

Swimming

Weightlifting

Wrestling

Officials
Team officials included:
 Manager – Ron Shakespeare
 Assistant manager – Ashley Taylor
 Chaperone – Pat Cheesman
 Medical officer – Mayne Smeeton
 Athletics
 Section manager – J. Hutchinson
 Coach – Frank Sharpley
 Badminton section manager – Valentine Arthur Horne
 Boxing section manager – Dick Dunn
 Cycling
 Section manager – Merv Gamble
 Coach – John Peoples
 Fencing section manager – Brian Hampton
 Shooting section manager – J. M. Ross
 Swimming and diving
 Section manager – A. J. Donaldson
 Coach – Morry Doidge
 Weightlifting section manager – Tony George
 Wrestling section manager – Barrie Courtney

See also
New Zealand Olympic Committee 
New Zealand at the Commonwealth Games
New Zealand at the 1964 Summer Olympics
New Zealand at the 1968 Summer Olympics

References

External links
NZOC website on the 1966 games 
Commonwealth Games Federation website

1966
Nations at the 1966 British Empire and Commonwealth Games
British Empire and Commonwealth Games